The centered polyhedral numbers are a class of figurate numbers, each formed by a central dot, surrounded by polyhedral layers with a constant number of edges. The length of the edges increases by one in each additional layer.

Examples
 Centered tetrahedral numbers
 Centered cube numbers
 Centered octahedral numbers
 Centered dodecahedral numbers
 Centered icosahedral numbers
 Stella octangula numbers

References
 

Figurate numbers